"I Heard a Rumour" is a song by English girl group Bananarama from their fourth studio album, Wow! (1987). It was released on 29th June 1987, as the album's lead single. It was also featured in the 1987 comedy film Disorderlies and is included on its soundtrack.

"I Heard a Rumour" peaked at number 14 on the UK Singles Chart,. It was one of Bananarama's highest-charting singles in the United States – it reached number four on the Billboard Hot 100 and became their third and final top ten hit. It was also their last top 40 hit on that chart. It was also successful in nightclubs, reaching number three on the Billboard Dance Club Songs. 

The track bears notable similarities in part to Michael Fortunati's "Give Me Up", which was released in early 1986. However, producer Mike Stock denied the track was based excessively on that record, insisting "I Heard A Rumour" was simply broadly inspired by Europop trends at the time.

"We didn't do sampling... There's no similarity in the lyric, there's no actual similarity in terms of note-for-noteness in the tune," he said. "We were doing Europop."

Music video
The music video, directed by Andy Morahan, features a dress-up theme, in a similar vein as their video for "Venus".

Group members Sara Dallin, Siobhan Fahey, and Keren Woodward are seen emulating various film stars, projected on screens behind them. One scene projected is the Dodge Twins dressed in jail stripped costumes performing the Lock Step. Each member dresses up in costumes, including a cowgirl and Carmen Miranda, backed up by topless male dancers. When the group is dressed in French can-can dresses, they bend over to "moon" the camera and expose the letters W-O-W (a reference to their album title) on their rears. They also appear in sequined red dresses on a rotating platform, surrounded by their dancers.

Bloopers of the girls making mistakes in the dance routine are intercut with other footage.

Track listings
7-inch single
"I Heard a Rumour" (Album Version) – 3:25
"Clean Cut Boy" (Party Size) – 4:22
S. Dallin/S. Fahey/K. Woodward/I. Curnow

12-inch single
"I Heard a Rumour" (Horoscope Mix) – 5:57
Available on the CD album The Twelve Inches of Bananarama
"I Heard a Rumour" (Dub) – 5:06
"Clean Cut Boy" (Party Size) – 4:22
S. Dallin/S. Fahey/K. Woodward/I. Curnow

2nd 12-inch single
"I Heard a Rumour" (Miami Mix) – 7:13
Also available for the first time on the CD album The Greatest Remixes Collection and the limited edition 2-cd version of The Very Best of Bananarama
Remixed by Phil Harding
"I Heard a Rumour" (House Mix) – 7:22
Remixed by Phil Harding
"Clean Cut Boy" (Party Size) – 4:22

US 12-inch maxi single / cassette
"I Heard a Rumour" (Horoscope Mix) – 5:57
"I Heard a Rumour" (Miami Mix) – 7:13
"I Heard a Rumour" (House Mix) – 7:22
"Clean Cut Boy" (Party Size) – 4:22

Other versions
"I Heard a Rumour" (Corporation Of Bananarama Mix) – 5:40
From the single "Megarama '89" and "Cruel Summer '89" 
Remixed by Freddie Bastone
"I Heard a Rumour" (Corporation Dub)
Remixed by Freddie Bastone
"I Heard a Rumour" (2001 Version)
Taken from the album Exotica

Charts

Weekly charts

Year-end charts

Cover version
The song was covered in Japanese by singer Tomoko Mayumi in 1987.

References

1987 singles
1987 songs
Bananarama songs
London Records singles
Music videos directed by Andy Morahan
Song recordings produced by Stock Aitken Waterman
Songs written by Keren Woodward
Songs written by Mike Stock (musician)
Songs written by Matt Aitken
Songs written by Pete Waterman
Songs written by Sara Dallin
Songs written by Siobhan Fahey